Ben 10: Protector of Earth is an action-adventure video game  developed by High Voltage Software and published by D3 Publisher and is based on the series animated television series Ben 10. This is the second Ben 10 game and it was released for the PlayStation 2, PlayStation Portable, the Nintendo DS and the  Nintendo Wii in late 2007.

Gameplay
The player controls Ben Tennyson and helps him to travel to five regions across the United States, in order to recover all the Omnitrix's DNA samples stolen by Vilgax, who want to use it to destroy the world. The gameplay consists of solving puzzles and defeating waves of enemies. Ben also has the access to his Omnitrix, which allows him to transform into different alien forms with specific abilities. At the beginning of the game, Ben is only able to access a few of his alien forms for a limited time, but after defeating a boss, Ben can access a new alien form (Fourarms, Heatblast, XLR8, Cannonbolt, and Wildvine) and unlocks the "master control," allowing him to stay in alien-form for an infinite amount of time, or switch between aliens without draining Omnitrix energy. Attack combos can be unlocked by collecting Omnitrix points. Limited power boosts or invincibility can be gathered, as well as bonuses to make the Omnitrix recharge faster. Three Sumo Slammer cards are hidden in each main level, and unlock features such as movie clips.

After each level, Plumber ranks are rewarded depending on how fast the player beat the level. If the player gets an A rank, they get a "character view," usually of a boss or a villain. In the main boss levels, a quick time event allows players to execute a special attack at certain points.

Version differences 
The Wii, PlayStation 2, and PlayStation Portable versions, developed by High Voltage Software, are largely identical to each other. A second player can join in co-op mode. The Wii version utilizes motion controls, such as simple flicks of the Wii Remote and Nunchuk to perform attacks, and pointing the Wii Remote at on-screen targets to execute quick-time events.

Unlike the other three versions, the Nintendo DS version is a side-scrolling, 2.5D beat 'em up, in which players can use the touchscreen to operate the Omnitrix, switching between available forms.

Plot

At the Grand Canyon, a mosquito-like drone sucks most of the DNA out of Ben's Omnitrix while he's sleeping. The next morning, a giant object crashes into the mountains and Ben finds out he can't transform into any of his aliens except Four Arms and Heatblast. After fighting through multiple drones, he defeats a Giant Mech Drone and finds an Omnitrix Crystal which gives him access to XLR8.

Later, the Tennysons go to Mesa Verde and find Vilgax's drones and the Forever Knights fighting. After defeating the knights and drones, a Forever Knight tells them that Enoch has used Area 51's technology to make a battle robot to fight Ben. They go to Area 51 in Nevada and fight Enoch, but he recovers and flees inside his robot. After defeating Enoch's battle robot at the Hoover Dam, Ben finds another Omnitrix Crystal which regains access to Cannonbolt.

When the Tennysons head to San Francisco, California for a vacation, they find out that Kevin 11 and some plant creatures have escaped from the Null Void. He kidnaps Grandpa Max, but later gets sucked to the Null Void again by Ben at a lumber mill in Oregon. After fighting through Crater Lake, they head to the Space Needle in Seattle where the mother plant has made its home and infecting the city. After defeating it, Ben finds an Omnitrix Crystal which gives him access to Wildvine.

In outer space, Vilgax and Ghostfreak work together to recover the Omnitrix. Ben, Gwen, and Grandpa Max head to Effigy Mounds for camping, and find some of Ghostfreak's troops hunting. After defeating Hex, they discover that Ghostfreak had plundered the Plumber Base in Mt. Rushmore. Ben chases him through Chicago and then defeats him in the Gold Coast Theater, and Grandpa Max sucks him into the Null Void.

After defeating Ghostfreak, they go to the Historic Battlefield, where Dr. Animo kidnaps Gwen. They go to the Bayou and discover Clancy in an abandoned mansion. After Ben defeats Clancy, he tells him that Dr. Animo's planning to turn Gwen into a mutant. Ben and grandpa travel to New Orleans and take a boat to Animo's oil refinery. After defeating Dr. Animo, Gwen tells them that Dr. Animo and Vilgax have planned to suck Earth into the Null Void. Ben then unlocks Master Control in the Omnitrix.

After going to a Null Void portal-filled Washington DC, Ben defeats SixSix and his Detrovite troops in Cape Canaveral. Grandpa Max uses rockets found there to make the Rustbucket capable of flight. Then, they fly to Vilgax's Ship and Ben tries to defeat Vilgax. After a battle that ends with Vilgax's defeat, Ben discovers that the rest of the Omnitrix Crystals are on the ship. After he retrieves them, the ship starts powering down and projects a Null Void portal, which then sucks in Vilgax and his ship. Ben, Gwen, and Grandpa Max escape in time and return to their vacation.

Reception

Critical reception has been mainly average. IGN scored the Wii, PlayStation 2 and PlayStation Portable versions a 6.8 out of 10, commenting that the cel-shaded graphics, simple gameplay and on-the-fly saving suits the target demographic but was unable to recommend it for hardcore gamers.  Lucas M. Thomas scored the Nintendo DS version one point higher, praising its gameplay and sound.

Eurogamer gave the Wii, PlayStation 2 and PlayStation Portable versions 5 out of 10, highlighting the drop-in drop-out two player mode and decent cutscenes, but criticising the bland environments.

Sales
The game sold more than 2.5 million units worldwide by November 2008.

References

External links
Ben 10: Protector of Earth at Internet Movie Database
Protector of Earth (PS2) at IGN
Protector of Earth (Wii) at GameSpot

2007 video games
D3 Publisher games
Protector of Earth
PlayStation 2 games
Wii games
Nintendo DS games
PlayStation Portable games
Video games developed in the United States
Video games set in Arizona
Video games set in California
Video games set in Chicago
Video games set in Colorado
Video games set in Louisiana
Video games set in Nevada
Video games set in New Orleans
Video games set in Oregon
Video games set in San Francisco
Video games set in Seattle
Video games set in South Dakota
Video games set in Washington, D.C.
High Voltage Software games
Ben 10
3D platform games
Multiplayer and single-player video games
Video games with cel-shaded animation
Superhero video games
Cartoon Network video games
1st Playable Productions games